Donald J. Devine (born 1937) is an American political scientist, author, former government official and politician who has studied, written  and promoted the philosophy of conservative fusionism as taught to him by the U.S. philosopher Frank Meyer.

Personal life

The Washington Post labeled Donald Devine as Ronald Reagan's "terrible swift sword of the civil service" when he served as Director of the U.S. Office of Personnel Management during President Reagan's first term, The New York Times called him "the Grinch," and the Federal Times titled him the "Rasputin of the reduction in force – all because he helped cut 100,000 bureaucratic jobs and save over $6 billion reducing generous benefits.

Before and after his government service he has been an academic, teaching 14 years as associate professor of government and politics at the University of Maryland and for a decade as a professor of Western civilization at Bellevue University. He is currently Senior Scholar for The Fund for American Studies, an adjunct scholar at The Heritage Foundation, a writer and a Washington policy consultant. He also serves as a Trustee of the Philadelphia Society.

Donald Devine was born in Bronxville, New York to Frances Phelan Devine and John Devine. He was raised by his mother in his grandfather Frank Phelan's home in Brooklyn and educated at Catholic schools in New York. He lives in Shady Side, Maryland and is married to the former Ann Smith. Devine and his wife have four children and fourteen grandchildren.

He graduated from St. John's University New York with a B.B.A. in management and economics in 1959. He was granted an MA in Political Science from Brooklyn College City University of New York in 1965. He earned a Ph.D. in political science from the Maxwell School at Syracuse University in 1967. He served as a member of the U.S. Army Reserve from 1960 to 1966. He is the author of eight books, The Attentive Public, The Political Culture of the United States, Does Freedom Work?, Reagan Electionomics, Reagan's Terrible Swift Sword, Restoring the Tenth Amendment, In Defense of the West, and America's Way Back.

An interviewer commented upon Devine's mix of academics and politics this way: "You served President Ronald Reagan in a way that saved billions for us taxpayers while reinforcing the better federal employees. Yet you come out of the University and, while respecting theory, wrote a semi-memoir that is so full of political reality as to scramble the pro-business notions of the right and the pro-bureaucracy tendencies of the left."

Academic career

Devine was appointed Assistant Professor of Government and Politics at University of Maryland, College Park in 1967 and was promoted to Associate Professor with tenure in 1970, serving there until 1980 teaching graduate and undergraduate students in the fields of American government and politics, public opinion and democratic theory, and  methodology and philosophy of science. During this period he was identified with the empirical democracy school and earned a National Science Foundation and several University of Maryland research awards for methodological pursuits and was a popular lecturer among students, who were frustrated for not being able to guess his philosophical orientation until the final course session.

As a professor, he wrote three books and several articles in professional journals. His writing in the period emphasized relating major political philosophy themes to empirical aspects of American society and government. The first book was titled The Attentive Public:  Polyarchical Democracy  This book was his Ph.D. thesis and was selected to be included in the prestigious American Politics Research Series, edited by Berkeley Professor Aaron Wildavsky, who supervised this series devoted to advanced methodological approaches to important aspects of American politics. Professor Arend Liphart called the book "an excellent example of a fresh look at one of the most basic questions in the empirical study of democracy, the relationship between popular demands and outputs." Professor Samuel Kirkpatrick said it was "a major contribution to the literature on empirical modifications of democratic theory."

Devine's most widely cited academic book was his second, The Political Culture of the United States.    The book took the writings of John Locke and the American Federalist Papers and related their expectations of popular political culture with what Americans have in fact believed as represented by all of the recorded scientific polls taken by the time of the writing. This book was included as one of the featured books in the Analytical Comparative Politics Series, edited by UCLA Professor Gabriel Almond who called it "one of the most distinguished pieces of secondary analysis in the field." Professor James Danielson labeled it "a valuable piece of synthesizing" of almost all published polls from the 1930s birth of opinion polls to the present. Professor Glenn Parker said it added "appreciably to existing knowledge." Professor Alan Monroe said it was "a thorough examination of American political culture based upon survey data."

Government service

In 1981, Professor Devine was appointed by President Ronald Reagan and confirmed by the U.S. Senate as Director of the U.S. Office of Personnel Management. In this position he served as chief executive officer and principal policy-maker for the United States civil service: setting personnel policies for 2 million civilian government employees and managing a budget authority of $30 billion.

During this period he also served on the Cabinet Council on Management and Administration 1982–1985, the President's Commission on White House Fellowships 1981–1985, the President's Council on Integrity and Efficiency, 1981–1985, the President's Commission on Executive Exchange 1981–1987, and the Intergovernmental Advisory Committee on Education 1988–1990.

Devine's government experiences during this period were recorded in his 1991 book Reagan's Terrible Swift Sword:  Reforming and Controlling the Federal Bureaucracy The book explained how the Reagan Administration analyzed and reformed the Federal Government against the opposition of its bureaucracy and political establishment. Professor Wildavsky said that the book was "an extraordinarily creative combination of inside information and sophisticated social science analysis." Rockefeller University Professor Richard Nathan called it "an important book about democracy and bureaucracy."

In a 2009 interview Devine presented much inside information about the bureaucracy, government and politics not contained in the written book.

Devine's administrative critics

The OPM director has a term appointment for four years which for Devine ended in 1985. He sought re-appointment but withdrew his nomination in the face of political and bureaucratic opposition and testimony from his former deputy that he requested her to lie to Congress about the nature of his consultant appointment while awaiting reconfirmation. His primary opposition was from the federal sector unions and executive associations. As a Washington Post feature on him said, he "has overseen the RIF-ing of thousands of federal workers, cut salaries and expense accounts by 8 percent, reduced disability retirements by 40 percent, eliminated abortion coverage from federal health insurance programs, and threatened the automatic merit pay system…[plus] the sacred bulwark of the federal employee retirement system….he has taken on Congress, unions, federal courts, insurance companies, other government agencies, even his own party."

As a result, "at the mere mention of his name, federal workers grit their teeth and express fear and loathing." Congresswoman Mary Rose Oakar (D-OH) is quoted as saying he was "arrogant, I think he's philosophically intransigent." He was supported by the Wall Street Journal  and the Washington Times which said he "succeeded astonishingly well" in his four years, but with unified Democratic Senate opposition to his re-appointment and two Republicans with large public employee constituencies claiming he exceeded his authority, he was forced to withdraw his nomination.

In promoting a decentralized and political model of administration advanced by Professor Vincent Ostrom, Devine also incurred the opposition of the professional public administration community. His speech to the American Society for Public Administration at the beginning of his term supposedly led to the largest number of requests for transcripts in the history of the organization. Twenty years later he was still being used as a contrarian against the prevailing public administration doctrine. Other public administration scholars noted that Devine's focus on OPM as a political instrument of the executive branch lost the traditional management orientation of OPM. Subsequent directors appointed under President George H. W. Bush(Constance Horner and Constance Newman) returned OPM to its original focus.

Political life

Devine served as a senior advisor to Governor Reagan from 1976 to 1980. His experiences in this role were published in his 1983 book Reagan Electionomics  The book explored the social, political, and philosophical basis for the election of Ronald Reagan as President of the United States, which Publishers Weekly called a "significant" contribution to understanding the 1980 election.

After leaving government he became a top advisor to Senate Majority Leader Bob Dole from 1988 to 1996 and later to publisher Steve Forbes between 1998 and 2000. Devine was fired from the 1988 Dole campaign over a bitter dispute with campaign Chairman William Brock. As president of Donald Devine Company he has been an advisor to the National Republican Senatorial Committee, the National Republican Congressional Committee and many candidates for political office. He has been a Republican nominee for Congress and for state comptroller in Maryland.

His 1996 book Restoring the Tenth Amendment  told the story of the "long time movement of American government and politics away from the federalist roots of the Constitution and how this contributed to the inability of the national government to work with so many additional responsibilities assumed from state and local governments and the private sector". Sen. Dole recommended it as the way to understand his desire to return powers to the states and the people, to "increase citizen responsibility and take back control of lives and communities."

Lecturer, consultant, scholar

Devine has been an Adjunct Scholar at The Heritage Foundation since 1992, producing several research papers, primarily on government management issues Between 1986 and 2000, he was a regular columnist for The Washington Times and afterwards editor of the American Conservative Union Foundation's ConservativeBattleline. In 2000, he was appointed professor of political science at Bellevue University where he served for a decade teaching in the classroom and on line, reforming its Western civilization curriculum, and writing. He co-edited a book of readings on Western Civilization for Bellevue University Press in 2002 to be used as course material at the university.

In 2004, he published a book In Defense of the West  that was adopted as the textbook for the required course in Western civilization.  From foreign terrorism to domestic cynicism about its once self-evident truths, this book found Western values and American institutions under siege and asked whether these values could survive or even be defended in a civilization that questions everything?  Professor William Peterson called it a "richly philosophical and carefully documented work" on the roots of America's culture.

In 2011 Devine became Senior Scholar at The Fund for American Studies teaching its seminar on the U.S. Constitution to Washington DC interns and introducing a new generation to fusionist philosophy. In 2012, ISI Books published Devine's America's Way Back that summarized his fusionist philosophy and the conclusions for America's future he drew from it. In 2017, Jameson Books republished an abridged second edition Of his 1991 book on government administration in paper and in Kindle retitled as Political Management of the Bureaucracy: A Guide to Reform and Control.

Fusionist philosophy

Living in New York and attending St. John's University, Devine was greatly influenced by professors John Hurley, Charles Crowley and Francis Canavan and the founding editors of National Review magazine William F. Buckley Jr. and Frank S. Meyer. Like Meyer he was also influenced by the Nobel economist/philosopher F.A. Hayek. The Liberty Fund edition of Meyer's major essays lists Devine as among a small group of his followers who most advanced Meyer's version of fusionist conservatism. Ronald Reagan identified this fusionism as the conservatism "recognized by many as modern conservatism." Devine is attributed by one analyst with summarizing fusionism's doctrine in one phrase as "utilizing libertarian means in a conservative society for traditionalist ends."

Some type of fusionist solution that unites social and economic conservatism is accepted by most on the American right. But most of these refer to a political fusion rather than a philosophical resolution between the two elements, desiring a coalition of interests rather than seeing a need for a deeper philosophical resolution of both into a synthesis as required by philosophical fusionism as taught by Meyer. Both Devine's 1976 book Does Freedom Work?  and his latest America's Way Back  are inspired by Meyer's vision and provide an extended consideration and analysis of this brand of fusionist conservatism.

Following Meyer, freedom is viewed as the preeminent political value. The state has only three legitimate functions – police, military and operating a legal system, all necessary to control coercion, which is immoral if not restricted. There is an obligation to others but it is individual, for even the "Great Commandment" is expressed in individual form: God, neighbor and oneself are individual. Freedom must be balanced by responsibility. For freedom by itself has no goal, no intrinsic ends to pursue. Freedom is not abstract or utopian as with the utilitarians, who make freedom an end rather than a means. A utopia of freedom is a contradiction in terms. In a real society traditional order and freedom can only exist together in tension. To retain the essentiality of both freedom and tradition, the solution to the dilemma is "grasping it by both horns" The solution is a synthesis of both, even in the face of those who argue that no such synthesis is possible or even logical.

Does Freedom Work? is an analytical study expanding earlier work on John Locke and Adam Smith and relating both classical authors to an earlier Western tradition that embraced both that tradition and their ideas about political freedom. The book then applied that political philosophy to that of America's Founders and compared these to empirical aspects of America today. Georgetown University Professor George Carey called Devine's book "refreshing and thought provoking,"  while Professor Tibor Machan found reflecting upon its mix of philosophical and empirical research a "rewarding experience  and William Buckley found it "wonderfully useful."

The more recent America's Way Back  started with that same combination of tradition and freedom in Western civilization arguing that what is required today is an understanding of this profound synthesis underlying the Constitution, reviving its harmony between freedom and tradition, a fusion whose tension has been the lifeblood not merely of the American experience but of all Western Civilization. As Nobel laureate Hayek concluded, "a successful free society will always in large measure be a tradition-based society," since freedom requires law and law necessitates traditional virtue.

America's Way Back  begins with the disturbing judgment from the nation's leading public administration expert that American government can no longer faithfully execute its laws. The 20th Century welfare state begun under Woodrow Wilson had run its course, tottering on stagnation and bankruptcy.

Devine's major thesis has been that the progressive movement against the old Constitutional order had become so successful politically in both political parties over the past century that few Americans now understand their original government and how their Constitution provided the foundation for its historical success. This lack of understanding has produced a profound unease with how government works and explains why society has not responded positively to the changes, provoking a widespread demand for an alternative. There is a general agreement, Devine argues, that something is profoundly wrong and that something about the nation's greatness is being lost. For many, this has meant a turning toward the Constitution and the principles underlying it, which he argues is the only real alternative.
Needless to say Devine's philosophy is controversial especially from the perspectives of the component elements of his synthesis, claiming either traditionalism or libertarianism cannot be harmonized, as they did concerning his fusionist mentor, Frank S. Meyer.

Paleoconservative Samuel Francis argued that Devine's fusionism was an unsuccessful attempt to absorb an indivisible traditionalism into pluralist libertarianism. On the other hand, libertarian Nick Gillespie argued libertarian means inevitably lead to libertarian rather than traditionalist ends. Meanwhile, the left claimed neither element had much validity. While his philosophical synthesis and his governmental and political activism provoked substantial opposition from many sides, they also claimed some measure of public support.

Works
 The Attentive Public:  Polyarchical Democracy, Chicago: Rand McNally, 1970
 The Political Culture of the United States:  The Mass Influence On Regime Maintenance, Boston:  Little, Brown and Company, 1972
 Does Freedom Work?  Liberty and Justice in America, Ottawa, Illinois:  Caroline House, 1978.
 Reagan Electionomics, 1976–1984:  How Reagan Ambushed the Pollsters, Ottawa, Illinois:  Green Hill Publishers, 1983
 Reagan's Terrible Swift Sword:  Reforming and Controlling the Federal Bureaucracy, Ottawa: Jameson Books, 1991
 Restoring the Tenth Amendment: The New American Federalist Agenda, Ft. Lauderdale: Vytis, 1996
 In Defense of the West: American Values Under Siege, Dallas: University Press of America, 2004.
 America's Way Back: Freedom, Tradition, Constitution: Wilmington, ISI Books, 2013.
Political Management of the Bureaucracy: A Guide to Reform and Control: Ottawa, IL: Jameson Books, 2017, Abridged Second Edition of Reagan's Terrible Swift Sword.
The Enduring Tension: Capitalism and the Moral Order: New York: Encounter Books, 2021.

References

External links
 "Ronald Reagan DID change the world, and his successors know it. The pragmatic sense in Obama is part of that"
 The Heritage Foundation
 Columns: Donald Devine | The American Conservative Union
 Battleline Archive | The American Conservative Union
 Our Philosophy | The American Conservative Union
 

1937 births
American libertarians
Syracuse University alumni
Brooklyn College alumni
American magazine editors
American political scientists
American political writers
American male non-fiction writers
People from Bronxville, New York
Living people